Swap or SWAP may refer to:

Finance 
 Swap (finance), a derivative in which two parties agree to exchange one stream of cash flows against another 
 Barter

Science and technology 
 Swap (computer programming), exchanging two variables in the memory of a computer
 Swap partition, a partition of a computer data storage used for paging
 SWAP (instrument) (Sun Watcher using Active Pixel System Detector and Image Processing), a space instrument aboard the PROBA2 satellite
 SWAP (New Horizons) (Solar Wind At Pluto), a science instrument aboard the unmanned New Horizons space probe
 SWAP protein domain, in molecular biology
 Size, weight and power (SWaP), see DO-297

Other 
 Swåp, an Anglo-Swedish folk music band
 Sector-Wide Approach (SWAp), an approach to international development

See also 
 Swaps (horse) (1952–1972), a California-bred American Thoroughbred racehorse
 Swapping (disambiguation)